Campwin Beach is a coastal town and rural locality in the Mackay Region, Queensland, Australia.

Geography 
The J-shaped locality is bounded by the Coral Sea to the east, the Castrades Inlet to the north-west, and loosely by an unnamed creek to the west.

The headland in the north-east has Coral Point as its northernmost point. The headland area has a rocky coast with Coral Point Reef just off the north-east coast of the locality. Campwin Beach is a sand beach to the south of the rocky headland and is accessible to the public via Campwin Esplanade.

The north-east of the locality is residential (the town) while the southern part is occupied by the Campwin Beach Prawn Farm. Much of land alongside Castrades Inlet is marshland and undeveloped.

History 
The original owners of  the land were businessman James Campbell and William Winter and the town name is a combination of their surnames. The town was officially named and bounded on 30 January 2009, but name was in use earlier since at least 1930. 

Economy 
The Campwin Bay prawn farm typically yields  of prawns each year, which are cooked on site and auctioned through the Sydney Fish Market.

Amenities 
There is a boat ramp into the Castrades Inlet at the end of Campwin Beach Boat Ramp Road.

Education 
There are no schools in the locality. The nearest primary school is Alligator Creek State School at Alligator Creek to the north-west. The nearest secondary school is Sarina State High School in Sarina to the south-west.

References

External links 
 Town map of Campwin Beach, 1980

Towns in Queensland
Mackay Region
Coastline of Queensland
Localities in Queensland